Christian Dalle Mura (born 2 February 2002) is an Italian footballer who plays as a centre back for Serie B club SPAL, on loan from Fiorentina.

Club career

Fiorentina
Dalle Mura started his youth career at Juventus club in Viareggio in northern Tuscany. While there, he was spotted by Alberto Bernardeschi, father of Juventus and former Fiorentina winger Federico Bernardeschi, and had a successful trial with Fiorentina and immediately joined their youth team.

Dalle Mura was called up to the Fiorentina senior side for the first time when the club travelled to reigning champions Juventus on 2 February 2020, his 18th birthday. He did not feature as Fiorentina fell to a 0–3 defeat. He made his professional debut for Fiorentina as a last-minute substitute in the club's 3–1 victory over SPAL in the Serie A on 2 August 2020.

Loan to Reggina
On 22 January 2021, Dalle Mura joined Serie B side Reggina on loan for the remainder of the season.

Loan to Cremonese and Pordenone
On 20 August 2021, he went on loan to Cremonese in Serie B. Not finding space, on 4 January 2022, he returned to Fiorentina. On 6 January 2022, he joined Serie B club Pordenone on loan until the end of the season.

Loan to SPAL
On 30 June 2022, he went to Serie B side SPAL on loan until the end of the season.

International career
Dalle Mura was a member of the Italy U17 squad that finished as runners-up at the 2019 UEFA European Under-17 Championship. He started in the final on 19 May 2019 and picked up a yellow card as Italy fell 2–4 to the Netherlands at Tallaght Stadium in Dublin.

Career statistics

References

2002 births
People from Pietrasanta
Sportspeople from the Province of Lucca
Living people
Italian footballers
Italy youth international footballers
Association football defenders
ACF Fiorentina players
Reggina 1914 players
U.S. Cremonese players
Pordenone Calcio players
S.P.A.L. players
Serie A players
Serie B players
Footballers from Tuscany